Catada is a genus of moths of the family Erebidae. It was first described by Francis Walker in 1859.

Description
Palpi slender, sickle shaped and naked. Second joint reaching far above vertex of head and tapering to extremity. Third joint long and slender. Antennae of male somewhat thickened and flattened or minutely ciliated. Thorax and abdomen smoothly scaled. Forewings with vein 7 from upper angle of cell. Hindwings with vein 5 from middle of discocellulars, where veins 6 and 7 usually arise from cell.

Species
Some species of this genus are:
 Catada agassizi Holloway, 2008
 Catada antipodalis (Holland, 1900)
 Catada auchja Lödl, 2002
 Catada bellaria Lödl & Paumkirchner, 2001
 Catada bipartita (Moore, 1882)
 Catada canaliferalis (Moore, 1877)
 Catada charalis Swinhoe, 1900
 Catada cornesi Lödl, 2001
 Catada dahlioides Rothschild, 1915
 Catada dichroana (Viette, 1958)
 Catada griseomarginalis (Rothschild, 1915)
 Catada ja Lödl, 2001
 Catada janalis (Schaus, 1893)
 Catada ndalla Bethune-Baker, 1911
 Catada nebrida Holloway, 2008
 Catada obscura de Joannis, 1906
 Catada phaeopasta Hampson, 1909
 Catada philemonalis (Walker, 1859)
 Catada psychis Lödl & Paumkirchner, 2001
 Catada purpureotincta Hampson, 1895
 Catada rubricaea Schultze, 1907
 Catada rufula Holloway, 2008
 Catada transversalis (Moore, 1877)
 Catada vagalis Walker, 1859

References

Lödl, Martin (1999). "Redescription of Catada vagalis (Walker, [1859] 1858) and some notes on the genus Catada Walker, (1859) 1858 (Lepidoptera: Noctuidae: Hypeninae)". Quadrifina. 2: 137–144.

 

Hypeninae
Moth genera